Nushk (also Romanized as Nūshk) is a village in Jowzar Rural District, in the Central District of Mamasani County, Fars Province, Iran. At the 2006 census, its population was 42, in 13 families.

References 

Populated places in Mamasani County